Dina Nath Sharma, alias Ashok, is a Nepalese politician. In 1999 he led a revolt within the CPN (Masal) against the party leadership. On April 6, 1999, Sharma split from the party and constituted his own parallel Communist Party of Nepal (Masal). Sharma's party called for boycott of elections and supported the armed struggle. Soon after the split Sharma's party merged with the Communist Party of Nepal.

Sharma was inducted in the Maoist politburo. Sharma represented the Maoists during the 2003 peace-talks.

After the end of the 2006 democracy movement in Nepal, Sharma was included in the group sent to Kathmandu to start peace negotiations with the new government.

In early 2005 Sharma was, along with Baburam Bhattarai and Hisila Yami, demoted by the party supremo Prachanda. In July of that year Prachandra reinstated Sharma into the politburo.

References

External links
dnsharma.com

1945 births
Living people
Nepalese atheists
People from Baglung District
Communist Party of Nepal (Masal) (historical) politicians
Communist Party of Nepal (Masal) (1999) politicians
Communist Party of Nepal (Maoist Centre) politicians
Members of the National Assembly (Nepal)
Nepal Communist Party (NCP) politicians
People of the Nepalese Civil War

Members of the 1st Nepalese Constituent Assembly